Dick Metz is an American former professional tennis player.

Metz, a native of California, played his junior and senior collegiate seasons at the UCLA Bruins, where he was a member of the 1979 NCAA championship team. A doubles silver medalist at the World University Games, Metz earned All-American honors for the Bruins in 1980. His time at UCLA included a win over future ATP top 10 player Tim Mayotte. 

In 1982 he featured in the singles main draw of the Benson and Hedges Open in Auckland and made the final singles qualifying round of the Wimbledon Championships.

Metz was later the tour coach of WTA Tour player Patty Fendick.

References

External links
 
 

Year of birth missing (living people)
Living people
American male tennis players
UCLA Bruins men's tennis players
Medalists at the 1979 Summer Universiade
Universiade silver medalists for the United States
Universiade medalists in tennis
Tennis people from California
American tennis coaches